Brian Flannery (born 1974) is an Irish hurler who presently plays with Mount Sion GAA at club level and formerly with Waterford at inter-county level.

Flannery is originally from the North Tipperary village of Puckane but moved to Waterford in 1996 and started to play for Mount Sion GAA.  Brian originally played with his local team, Kildangan GAA in County Tipperary.

As well as having represented Waterford GAA at Senior Inter-County level, Brian also represented his home county of Tipperary at Minor and Under-21 level having won the All-Ireland Under 21 Hurling Championship with them in 1995.

His key achievement with Waterford GAA was winning the Munster Senior Hurling Championship in 2002.

Honours
 Munster Senior Hurling Championship winner – 2002
 All-Ireland Under 21 Hurling Championship winner – 1995 (with Tipperary GAA)
 Munster Under-21 Hurling Championship winner – 1995 (with Tipperary GAA)
 Munster Minor Hurling Championship winner – 1991 (with Tipperary GAA)
 Waterford Senior Hurling Championship winner – 1998, 2000, 2002.
 Waterford Junior Hurling Championship winner – 2011

Championship Appearances

Waterford inter-county hurlers
Tipperary inter-county hurlers
Mount Sion hurlers
Kildangan hurlers (Tipperary)
Living people
1974 births